Fort Richmond Collegiate (Commonly known as FRC or Fort Richmond) is a public high school located in Winnipeg, Manitoba, Canada. Fort Richmond Collegiate is one of 35 schools in the Pembina Trails School Division. The school offers instruction in English, grades 10–12.

Achievements
In the school year of 2005–2006, 3 National Scholars out of 16 in Manitoba came from FRC. They achieved a score of 4 or 5 on the 5 point AP grading scale on a minimum of 5 AP exams.
In 2008, 63 students received a Centurion Pin. These pins are handed out to students who participated in at least 240 hours of extra curricular activities.
Both the Concert Band and Jazz Band have participated in the MusicFest Canada Festival (one of the 2 Canadian national level festivals) every year for the past 45 years.
The Senior Improv Team made Provincial Finals at the Manitoba Improv League. Four FRC students were invited to perform at Rainbow Stage's Musical "Strike".
Out of 6500 students who participated in the University of Toronto National Biology Competition, two students from FRC were placed 2nd and 7th. FRC placed 3rd in the Competition out of over 450 schools across Canada.
1991/92 - Fort Richmond Centurions boys hockey team won the 1st ever MHSAA provincial hockey championship
in 2019/20 - Fort Richmond Centurions Boys hockey team won their 2nd ever MHSAA hockey championship

Notable alumni
 Arash Abizadeh

External links
Fort Richmond Collegiate
Pembina Trails School Division
FRC Centurions Girls Hockey Team

High schools in Winnipeg
Educational institutions established in 1967
1967 establishments in Manitoba

Fort Garry, Winnipeg